Gómez (frequently anglicized as Gomez) is a common Spanish patronymic surname meaning "son of Gome". The Portuguese and Old Galician version is Gomes, while the Catalan form is Gomis. The given name Gome is derived from the Visigothic word guma, "man", with multiple Germanic cognates with the same meaning (Old English guma, Middle English gome)/gomo High Old German gomo, Middle High German gome), which are related to Latin homo, "man".


People
Notable people with the surname include:

A–E
 Alejandro "Papu" Gómez (born 1988), Argentine footballer
 Amaranta Gómez Regalado (born 1977), Mexican anthropologist
 Ana Sofía Gómez (born 1995), Guatemalan artistic gymnast
 Andrés Gómez (born 1960), Ecuadorian tennis player
 Arthur Gómez (born 1984), Gambian footballer
  Beatrice Luigi Gomez (born 1995), Miss Universe Philippines 2021
 Begoña Gómez Martín (born 1964), Olympic judoka
 Bolívar Gómez (born 1977), Ecuadorian footballer
 Camilo Gómez (born 1984), Colombian road cyclist
 Camilo R. Gomez (born 1960), American physician
 Carlos Gómez (born 1985), Dominican baseball
 Chief Gómez (fl. 18401850), a Mescalero Apache chieftain
 Daniel Gómez (disambiguation)
 Eleazar Gómez (born 1986) Mexican actor and model
 Emmanuel Gómez (born 1990), Gambian footballer

F–M
 Francis Gómez (born 1968), Venezuelan judoka
 Francisco Javier Gómez Noya, Spanish triathlete
 George Gomez (born 1955), Cuban-American industrial designer
 Ignacio Gómez (born c. 1962), Colombian journalist
 Jaime Luis Gomez, better known as Taboo (rapper) (born 1975), American rapper and actor
 Jaime P. Gomez, American film and television actor
 Jeronimo Gomez (born 1976), American musician
 Joe Gomez (born 1997), English footballer
 John Paul Gomez (born 1986): Filipino chess grandmaster
 Jordi Gómez (born 1985), Spanish footballer
 Jorge Gómez (born 1968), Chilean footballer
 José Dorángel Vargas Gómez (born 1957), Venezuelan serial killer and cannibal 
 Joshua Gomez (born 1975), American actor
 Juan Gómez (disambiguation), many individuals
 Juan Vicente Gómez (1857–1935), ruler of Venezuela in 1908–35
 Laureano Gómez Colombian president 1950–1951
 Lefty Gomez (1908–1989), American baseball player
 Lloyd Gomez (1922–1953), American serial killer
 Luis Humberto Gómez Gallo (1962−2013), Colombian industrial engineer
 María Cristina Gómez (1938–1989), Salvadoran murder victim
 Mariano Gomez (1799–1872), Filipino priest and martyr
 Mario Gómez (born 1985), German footballer
 Mauro Gómez (born 1984), Dominican baseball player
 Máximo Gómez (1836–1905), Dominican soldier in the Cuban War of Independence
 Melissa Castrillón Gómez (born 1995), Colombian chess player
 Michelle Gomez (born 1966), Scottish actress
 Michelle Gómez (born 1992), Colombian pageant titleholder and model
 Miguel Gómez (photographer) (born 1974), Colombian/American photographer

N–Z
 Oscar Gómez (disambiguation)
 Pat Gomez (artist) (born 1960), American artist
 Rebecca Marie Gomez (better known for her stage name Becky G) (born 1997), American singer and actress
 Richard Gomez (born 1966), Filipino actor and politician
 Rick Gomez (born 1972), American actor
 Roberto Gómez Bolaños (1929–2014) Mexican screenwriter, actor and comedian
 Scott Gomez (born 1979), American hockey player
 Sillvin Gomez (born 1995), Singer and Photographer
 Selena Gomez (born 1992), American actress and singer
 Sofía Gómez (born 1992), Colombian freediver
 Tamara Gómez Garrido (born 1991), Spanish triathlete
 Trifón Gómez (1889–1955), Spanish socialist politician 
 Ulysses Gomez (born 1983), Mexican-American mixed martial arts fighter
 Xochitl Gomez (born 2006), an American actress
 Yolanda Gómez (1962–2012), Mexican astronomer
 Zoraida Gómez (born 1985), Mexican actress, singer and model

Fictional
 Felipe Gómez, a character on the American television sitcom Three's Company
 Go-Go Gomez, a character from The Dick Tracy Show
 Gomez Addams, the patriarch of The Addams Family
 Gomez, the protagonist of the game Fez
 Steven Gomez, a fictional DEA agent in Breaking Bad

See also
Francisco Gómez (disambiguation)
Gomes (Portuguese)
Gomez (band) British rock/indie band
Gomis (Catalan)

References 

Spanish-language surnames
Patronymic surnames
Surnames of Guatemalan origin
Surnames of Colombian origin